The Nissarana Vanaya Meditation System was developed by Matara Sri Ñāṇārāma Mahathera, a highly respected senior meditation master of Sri Lanka and the first Upajjhaya of Sri Kalyani Yogasrama Samstha. This Buddhist meditation system uses samatha and vipassanā techniques in combination to allow what it claims are more intense insight results than ‘dry insight’ meditation. It was refined over decades by the head monks of the Nissarana Vanaya.

History
In the 1960s, after the sixth Buddhist council had given Mahasi Sayadaw an eminent role in the Buddhist meditation revival, he was invited by the Sri Lankan government to train, teach and help establish vipassana meditation centers in Sri Lanka.  At that time a group of already well known meditation monks received the opportunity to privately train and practice with Mahasi Sayadaw. Among those was the Venerable Matara Sri Ñāṇārāma Mahathera.

Mahasi Sayadaw made him the main vipassana teacher after his departure and a friend of Matara Sri Ñāṇanārāma Mahathera invited him to lead the training facility for meditation in a newly founded association of forest monasteries, the Nissarana Vanaya.

Over the years Ven. Ñāṇārāma Mahathera added valuable instructions to the Burmese system. One of the fundamental additions was a greater emphasis on concentration meditation as well as a carefully designed set of standardized instructions which helped newly ordained forest monks to methodically develop their concentration and insight faculties.

During this time the Ven. Ñāṇārāma Mahathera published two renowned books on insight meditation: The seven stages of purification and The seven contemplations. In the late 1980s, one of his foremost students, a former lecturer for Pali, the Venerable Katukurunde Ñāṇananda held 33 discourses on the topic Nibbana.

Many influential meditation teachers visited the monastery during this time (Ayya Khema) or were influenced by its meditation methodologies.

During the last decade of Ven. Ñāṇārāma Mahathera's life the meditation system was refined in its approach towards labeling and noting in vipassana meditation. The amount of labels was reduced, the importance of concentration meditation intensified.

Currently this system is taught in many of Sri Lankan forest monasteries which were influenced by Ven. Ñāṇārāma Mahathera.

Followers 
Famous meditation teachers who were trained in this system or variants thereof include:
 Ayya Khema
 Bhikkhu Ñāṇananda
 Nauyane Ariyadhamma Mahathera
 Balangoda Ananda Maitreya Thero
 Bhikkhu Dhammajīva, current abbot of the Nissarana Vanaya forest hermitage
 Mitra Wettimuny, a famous Sri Lankan lay meditation instructor
 Ven. Amatagavesi, a famous Sri Lankan meditation teacher
 Ven. Pannyavaro
 Several Western students now teaching in Great Britain, the US and Sri Lanka

References

External links 
 Mitra Wettimuny
 Nissarana Vanaya Blog
 Nissarana Vanaya Blog
 Nibbana Sermons
 Ñāṇarama's publications
 In the tradition of Ñāṇarama Mahatthera
 Information about Nissarana Vanaya
 History on the establishment of Yoghashrama Samsthava
 Interview with Ven. Pannyavaro
 Dhamma talks by Ven. Nyanarama Mahatthera
 Ven. Ariyadhamma Thera Bio

Notes

Buddhist meditation